Calvin, Don't Jump! started as the solo recording project of J. Kirk Pleasant, a musician with extensive connections to the Elephant 6 Collective. Before moving to Vancouver, British Columbia, Canada, he contributed to releases from bands like the Olivia Tremor Control, Black Swan Network, and Pipes You See, Pipes You Don't. His own albums have featured contributions from musicians like Scott Spillane (Neutral Milk Hotel, The Gerbils), Jeremy Barnes (Neutral Milk Hotel, A Hawk And A Hacksaw), John D'Azzo (The Gerbils), as well as Peter Erchick, Eric Harris, and John Fernandes (all of the Olivia Tremor Control).

Early in 2007, Pleasant announced that what had begun as a solo project would expand into a four-piece band, geared towards a poppier, more guitar driven sound. The band featured Pleasant (vocals and guitar), Nathan Matthews (bass), Lee-Ann Sheel (drums), and Shinobu Hata (keyboards).

Calvin, Don't Jump! released two full-length albums, as well as four 7" singles, a cd-r of live recordings, and a cassette EP titled Notes From Undersound. Pleasant's album Conscious of Conscience (2006) was his first true solo full-length album, drawing on assistance from no outside collaborators.

The band performed three concerts in 2010 and 2011 but appears to have broken up after that; its last social media post was in 2015.

Discography

Full-length albums
Crystal Clear Mississippi (1999, self-released)
A Way With Birds (2002, Happy Happy Birthday To Me Records)
Conscious of Conscience (2006, self-released)
Under Bridges (2010, self-released)

Live albums
Live on WFMU (Perhaps Transparent Records)

Singles
Calvin, Don't Jump!/Echo Orbiter Split (2000, Perhaps Transparent Records) 7"
Calvin, Don't Jump!/Ooss (2000, Norman Records) 7"
 Rusty Gondola/The Bleating (2000, Happy Happy Birthday To Me Records) 7"
 Crumble/Solamente La Euna Este Noche (Self-Released) 7"

EPsNotes From Undersound (1996, self-released)

CompilationsU.S. Pop Life Volume 5 (2000, Contact Records) CDWinter Report (2001, Hype City) CDHey, It's My Birthday! (2001, Happy Happy Birthday To Me) CassetteBuild Your Army With Potatoes (2008, Royal Rhino Flying Records) CD

Contributed toBlack Foliage: Animation Music Volume 1 (1999, Flydaddy Records) CD/2x12"Individualized Shirts'' (2001, Cloud Recordings and Orange Twin Records) CD

See also

Music of Canada
Music of Vancouver
Canadian rock
List of Canadian musicians
List of bands from Canada
List of bands from British Columbia
:Category:Canadian musical groups

References

External links
Calvin, Don't Jump! on Myspace
"Calvin, don't jump!" at ReverbNation

Musical groups established in 1999
Canadian indie rock groups
Canadian folk music groups
Canadian psychedelic rock music groups
Musical groups from Vancouver
1999 establishments in British Columbia